Kuju is a village in the Ardabil Province of Iran.

References

Tageo

Populated places in Ardabil Province